Yarmouth is a provincial electoral district in  Nova Scotia, Canada, that elects one member of the Nova Scotia House of Assembly. It consists of the Municipality of the District of Yarmouth and the town of Yarmouth. 

From 1867 to 1981, the district included all of Yarmouth County and for most of that time elected two members. 

In 1981, the district was redistributed and reduced to having just one MLA. The Municipality of Argyle received its own electoral district.

Geography

Members of the Legislative Assembly
This riding has elected the following Members of the Legislative Assembly:

Election results

1867 general election

1871 general election

1874 general election

1878 general election

1882 general election

1886 general election

1890 general election

1894 general election

1897 general election

1901 general election

1906 general election

1911 general election

1916 general election

1920 general election

1925 general election

1928 general election

1933 general election

1937 general election

1941 general election

1945 general election

1949 general election

1953 general election

1956 general election

1960 general election

1963 general election

1967 general election

1970 general election

1974 general election

1978 general election

1981 general election

1984 general election

1988 general election

1993 general election

1998 general election

1999 general election

2003 general election

2006 general election

2009 general election

2010 by-election

 
|Progressive Conservative
|Charles Crosby
|align="right"|2,628
|align="right"|33.40
|align="right"|-27.94

|Independent
|Belle Hatfield
|align="right"|673
|align="right"|8.55
|align="right"|Ø
 
|New Democratic Party
|John Deveau
|align="right"|513
|align="right"|6.52
|align="right"|-16.41

2013 general election

|-

|-
 
|Progressive Conservative
|John Cunningham
|align="right"|1,216
|align="right"|14.31
|align="right"|-19.10
|-
 
|New Democratic Party
|Charles Webster
|align="right"|224
|align="right"|2.64
|align="right"|-3.88
|-

|-

|}

2017 general election

2021 general election

References

External links
 2006 riding profile
 2003 riding profile

Nova Scotia provincial electoral districts
Yarmouth, Nova Scotia